Fingerroos is a Swedish-language surname, more common in Finland than in Sweden.

Geographical distribution
As of 2014, 96.4% of all known bearers of the surname Fingerroos were residents of Finland (frequency 1:29,238) and 1.5% of Sweden (1:3,282,253).

In Finland, the frequency of the surname was higher than national average (1:29,238) in the following regions:
 1. North Ostrobothnia (1:4,067)
 2. Central Ostrobothnia (1:16,718)
 3. Southwest Finland (1:16,963)

In Sweden, the frequency of the surname was higher than national average (1:3,282,253) in the following counties:
 1. Stockholm County (1:1,121,800)
 2. Skåne County (1:1,288,949)

People

References

Swedish-language surnames